Sarveswara may refer to:

 Bhavaraju Sarveswara Rao an economist and a social scientist.  
 Ramayanam Sarveswara Sastry an eminent Indian actor.
 Sarveswara Satakam Shaiva Bhakti Satakam, a collection of Telugu poems written by Yathavakkula Annamayya.